Dəstər (also, Daster, Dastyr’, and Dostar) is a village and municipality in the Lerik Rayon of Azerbaijan.  It has a population of 362.

Notable natives 

 Ali Huseynov — Full Cavalier of the Order of Glory.

References

External links

Populated places in Lerik District